Alok Rajwade (born 7 February 1989) is an Indian actor,  director, singer and painter. He has appeared in Marathi and Hindi films and experimental plays.

Early life
Rajwade was born and raised in Pune, where he attended Aksharnandan school. He went on to join Brihan Maharashtra College of Commerce for a Bachelor of Commerce degree. He was part of various theatre troupes like Aasakta Kalamanch and Samanvay. He was a founding member of the theatre troupe Natak Company, in 2008. He directed and acted in various plays for Natak Company.

Career
Rajwade's first major play was in Abhraham Lincolnche Patra (a Marathi Adaptation of Abraham Lincoln's Letter) by an organisation named Jagar. In 2008, he starred in the Bhojpuri film, Udedh Bun. In 2009, he was part of the critically acclaimed movie Vihir. In 2010, he wrote a play titled Geli Ekvis Varsha (which was directed by him as well) which was performed at Italy's Universo Teatro. In 2012, Rajwade was seen in Ha Bharat Maza. He was greatly appreciated for his roles in Rajwade and & Sons (2014) and Rama Madhav (2014). In the same year, he was also seen in the Hindi movie  Dekh Tamasha Dekh , portraying the role of Prashant.

In 2017, he was featured on Forbes India's 30 under 30 list. In 2018, he made his directorial debut in Marathi movies through Ashleel Udyog Mitramandal, written by Dharmakirti Sumant. In the same year, he was also part of the movie Dear Molly which was selected for the Academy Awards. He directed the play, A Doubtful Gaze at Uber at Midnight, which was staged at Serendipity Arts Festival 2018, in Goa.

He also features in Bharatiya Digital Party short video series Aai Ani Me, in which he plays Aniruddha aka Ani along with Renuka Daftardar(Aai) and Mrunmayee Godbole(Jui).

In 2019, he was a co-host of the series titled Safe Journeys. Rajwade was also awarded the Balasaheb Sarpotdar Award by his alma mater, Brihan Maharashtra College of Commerce.

Filmography

Films

Plays

Web-Series

Personal life
He dated Parna Pethe before tying the knot on 29 February 2016. They had a court marriage at Mangal Karyalay, Pune.

External links 
Alok Rajwade at IMDB

References

Male actors in Hindi cinema
Living people
Male actors in Marathi cinema
Marathi film directors
Indian male stage actors
Place of birth missing (living people)
1989 births
21st-century Indian film directors
21st-century Indian male actors
Film directors from Maharashtra